Lidiya Ryndina was a Russian Empire and Soviet film actress.

Selected filmography 
 1916 — Vozmezdiye
 1916 — Koldunya
 1916 — Razorvannye tsepi

References

External links 
 Лидия Рындина on kino-teatr.ru

Actresses from the Russian Empire
Soviet actresses
1883 births
1964 deaths